Mouloud is a town of Djibouti.

Mouloud or Mawlud may also refer to:

People
 Mawlud Mukhlis, an Iraqi politician.
 Mohamed Mouloud Harim, an Algerian footballer.
 Mouloud Achour, an Algerian writer, professor, and journalist.
 Mouloud Akloul, a French footballer.
 Mouloud Belatrèche, an Algerian footballer.
 Mouloud Feraoun, an Algerian writer.
 Mouloud Hamrouche, an Algerian politician. 
 Mouloud Kacem Naît Belkacem, an Algerian politician, philosopher, historian, and writer.
 Mouloud Mammeri, an Algerian writer, anthropologist and linguist.
 Mouloud Mekhnache, an Algerian handball player.
 Mouloud Moudakkar, a Moroccan footballer.
 Mouloud Noura, an Algerian judoka.

Places
 Mouloud Mammeri University, an Algerian university.
 Tafraout El Mouloud, a town and commune in Morocco.

See also 
 Mawlid (disambiguation)
 Mouloudia (disambiguation)